Spodnji Vrsnik is a small settlement next to Gorenji Vrsnik in the hills east of Idrija in the traditional Inner Carniola region of Slovenia.

References

External links

Spodnji Vrsnik on Geopedia

Populated places in the Municipality of Idrija